Ndabili Bashingili (born 28 December 1979 in Semitwe) is a Botswana marathon runner. Bashingili made his official debut for the 2004 Summer Olympics in Athens, where he placed twenty-fifth out of a hundred runners in the men's marathon, with a time of 2:18:09.

Four years after competing in his last Olympics, Bashingili qualified for the second time, as a 29-year-old, in the men's marathon at the 2008 Summer Olympics in Beijing. He successfully finished the race in fifty-ninth place by eight seconds behind Tanzania's Samson Ramadhani, with a time of 2:25:11.

References

External links
 

1979 births
Living people
People from Central District (Botswana)
Botswana male marathon runners
Olympic athletes of Botswana
Athletes (track and field) at the 2004 Summer Olympics
Athletes (track and field) at the 2008 Summer Olympics